Humayun Kabir Sadhu (known as Humayun Sadhu; 1 May 1982 – 25 October 2019) was a Bangladeshi television director, scriptwriter and actor.

Career 
Sadhu, was a man who wore many hats, a film director, actor and writer. He started his professional journey as an assistant to Mostofa Sarwar Farooki, and developed a fondness for directing since then. His first telefilm Un Manush earned a huge response from the audience. He has also written the book, Nonai.

Death 
Sadhu died on 25 October 2019 at Square Hospital in Dhaka.

Works

Television Drama

Films

References

External links 
 

1982 births
2019 deaths
People from Chittagong
Bangladeshi television directors
Bangladeshi male writers
Deaths from cerebrovascular disease